Glaucopsyche argali  is a butterfly found in the East Palearctic (Altai) that belongs to the blues family.

Subspecies
G. a. argali Southeast Altai
G. a. arkhar Lukhtanov, 1990 Saur, Manrak, Kurchum Mountains
G. a. chingiz Churkin, 2005 Mongolia

Description from Seitz

L. argali Elw. This species is said to be allied to melanops, but to have the upperside pale silver grey. — Elwes discovered this insect in the Altai.

Biology
The larva feeds on Larva on Oxytropis spp.

See also
List of butterflies of Russia

References

External links
Images representing Glaucopsyche argali  at Barcodes of Life

argali